At the 1948 Summer Olympics in London, four diving events were contested. The competitions were held from Friday 30 July 1948 to Friday 6 August 1948.

Medal summary
The events are labelled as 3 metre springboard and 10 metre platform by the International Olympic Committee, and appeared on the 1948 Official Report as springboard diving and highboard diving, respectively.

Men

Women

Participating nations

Medal table

Notes

References
 
 

 
1948 Summer Olympics events
1948
1948 in water sports
Diving competitions in the United Kingdom